Friedrich IX, Count of Hohenzollern (died between 1377 and 1379), nicknamed "Fredrick the Old" or "the Black Count", was a German nobleman. He was the ruling count of Hohenzollern from 1339 until his death.

Life 
He was the second son of Count Friedrich VIII.  In 1339, he succeeded his older brother Fritzli II  as Count of Hohenzollern.

On 27 July 1342, he closed a treaty of agnatic seniority with the Zollern-Schalksburg line, in which the senior of the two counts should decide who would be the next holder of the original fief of Zollern.  As Friedrich commanded a larger military power, he became a captain of the Lion League, an important organisation of Swabian noblemen.

In 1344, Friedrich IX divided the inheritance with his younger brother Friedrich of Strasbourg.  Friedrich IX founded the "Black Count" line, which ended with the death of his son Friedrich X in 1412.  In 1412, the Strasbourg line founded by his brother inherited the county; they were later raised to Princes of Hohenzollern.

Marriage and issue 
In 1341 Fredrick IX married Adelheid (d. after 1385), a daughter of Count Burchard V of Hohenberg-Wildenberg, with whom he had the following children:
 Friedrich X, the younger Black Count (d. 1412), Count of Hohenzollern, married Anna of Hohenberg (d. 1421)
 Adelheid (d. 1415), married Johann of Stralenberg (d. 1408)
 Friedrich "Easter Sunday" III (d. 1407/10)
 Anna (d. 1418), a nun in Königsfeld
 Sophia (d. 1418), a nun in Stetten

Footnotes

References 
 Graf Rudolph Stillfried-Alcántara and Traugott Maercker: Hohenzollerische Forschungen, C. Reimarus, 1847, p. 178 ff
 E. G. Johler: Geschichte, Land- und Ortskunde der souverainen teutschen Fürstenthümer Hohenzollern Hechingen und Sigmaringen, Stettin'sche Buchhandlung, Ulm, 1824, Online
 Gustav Schilling: Geschichte des Hauses Hohenzollern in genealogisch fortlaufenden Biographien aller seiner Regenten von den ältesten bis auf die neuesten Zeiten, nach Urkunden und andern authentischen Quellen, Fleischer, Leipzig, 1843, Online

Counts of Hohenzollern
Year of birth unknown
1370s deaths
Year of death unknown
14th-century German nobility